The Vermonter is a passenger train operated by Amtrak between St. Albans, Vermont, and Washington, D.C., via New York City. It replaced the overnight Montrealer, which terminated in  until 1995. Amtrak receives funding from the states of Connecticut, Massachusetts, and Vermont for Vermonter operations north of New Haven.

During fiscal year 2018, the Vermonter carried 97,909 passengers (not including riders between New Haven and Washington, D.C.), a 2.2% increase from FY17. In FY16, the train earned $5,718,268 in revenue, a decrease of 1.8% from FY15.

History

Montrealer

The Vermonter was preceded by an overnight train between Montreal and Washington that was known as the Montrealer, which was inaugurated in 1924 as a joint service of the Pennsylvania Railroad, the New Haven Railroad, the Boston & Maine Railroad, the Central Vermont Railway and the Canadian National Railway. Another train, the Ambassador, ran the same route during the daytime, but terminated in New York City. Both services used the Boston and Maine's Connecticut River Line south of Vernon, Vermont, rather than the route prior to 2014 over the New England Central. Amtrak took over the train in 1971, and continued operating it until 1995 (excepting a brief suspension from 1987 to 1989).

Vermonter

The Vermonter replaced the Montrealer on April 1, 1995, bringing daytime Amtrak service to Vermont.

Business Class was added to replace the sleeping cars that were taken out of service upon the change to the Vermonter. The route was changed to allow travelers from Vermont to again stop in Springfield and Hartford. This was made possible by the use of cab cars, or engineer positions on both ends, so that the train could travel east from Springfield to Palmer, Massachusetts, and reverse direction to continue north on the Central Vermont. This detour added an hour of running time, but at the time was judged more practical than seeking to use the direct route over the then-decayed former Boston and Maine Railroad trackage owned by the Guilford Rail System. The train travels from Washington to New Haven on the Northeast Corridor, where electric locomotives are substituted for the diesel locomotives used north of that location.

Vermont declined to pay for continuing the Vermonter to Montreal due to high labor and terminal costs in Montreal. For a time, Amtrak offered passengers a connecting Thruway bus service, operated by Vermont Transit, which met the train at St. Albans for connections to and from Montreal. Ridership plunged when the train schedule was moved two hours earlier, requiring a southbound departure before 5:00 a.m. The schedule was returned to its previous position, but the service was dropped by Vermont Transit (which had been running it without a subsidy as part of its regular schedule) on October 30, 2005.

On October 30, 2006, the Vermonter began stopping at the towns of Wallingford and Windsor Locks (near Bradley International Airport) in Connecticut for the first time.

In the late 2000s, Amtrak and the State of Vermont considered the purchase of diesel multiple unit (DMU) trainsets for use on the New Haven–St. Albans stretch of the line, with Amtrak offering a $2 million grant to help make the switch and market the new service. The new cars would purportedly have saved $4.25 million over three years, being four times more fuel efficient than a locomotive-hauled train. In 2008, the Vermont state legislature approved the purchase of five cars from Colorado Railcar at a cost of $18.2 million, but the company closed while the decision was awaiting approval of Governor Jim Douglas. With no other DMU designs available that were capable of operating in mixed traffic with other trains, the plan was dropped.

On October 5, 2012, the Federal Railroad Administration announced the completion of track work within the states of Vermont and New Hampshire for the above-mentioned stimulus plan. Within the states of Vermont and New Hampshire  of track were refurbished. The track work included installation of continuous welded rail, road-crossing improvements, ballast replacement, tie replacement, bridge repair and renovation, and embankment improvements. The Massachusetts portion of the track work was completed in 2015.

On October 5, 2015, the southbound Vermonter derailed in Northfield, Vermont, after striking a rock slide. Five cars and the engine derailed; the engine and an empty car slid down an embankment. Five passengers and two crew members were injured, one seriously.

These locations are served by other Amtrak trains and by the new Hartford Line commuter rail service.

The move was forced after the pandemic prompted Vermont Governor Phil Scott to declare a state of emergency. The Vermonter resumed its full route on July 19, 2021, with $1 promotional fares on that date for travel within Vermont.

2014 route change

Until 1987, the Montrealer traveled on the Connecticut River Line between Springfield and Brattleboro with a stop in Northampton. Due to the deteriorating condition of the tracks in that section, Amtrak ceased service by the train.

When the Vermonter service restored train service between Springfield's Union Station, Brattleboro and points north in 1995, the Vermonter traveled a somewhat-indirect route: east to Palmer, Massachusetts, and then north up the east side of the Connecticut River via Amherst, Massachusetts. It used CSX Transportation's Boston Subdivision between Springfield and Palmer. At Palmer, it made a backup move on to the New England Central Railroad (NECR), as no direct track connection existed. Massachusetts later rehabilitated the more-direct Connecticut River Line route with $10 million in state and $73 million in federal American Recovery and Reinvestment Act funds.

During rehabilitation of the Connecticut River Line, Vermonter service was restored to it on December 29, 2014. The re-route and consequent elimination of the backup move saved about 25 minutes of travel time between Springfield and Brattleboro when the line rehabilitation was completed, in early 2015. 

Although the backup move at Palmer is eliminated by the re-route, a short backup move at Springfield is still required due to the layout of the tracks.  The tracks at Springfield Union Station run east-west, so northbound Vermonters need to curve into the station, back out, and switch back onto the tracks continuing north.  And the opposite move occurs for southbound trains.

In January 2015, the number of Vermonter riders using the two new stations (in Northampton and Greenfield) was up 84 percent compared to the equivalent station in Amherst the previous year.

On March 26, 2020, service north of New Haven was temporarily suspended. On November 30, 2020, service was cut back further from New Haven to New York. This was done in response to the COVID-19 pandemic. Service to St. Albans resumed on July 19, 2021.

Planned extension of the Vermonter to Montreal
Efforts have been underway for many years to extend the Vermonter to Montreal. In 2012, the Federal Railroad Administration awarded $7.9 million to allow for the upgrade of the existing freight rail line between St. Albans and the Canada–US border. Work on this project was completed in late 2014.

On March 16, 2015, Canada and the United States signed the "Agreement on Land, Rail, Marine, and Air Transport Preclearance Between the Government of the United States of America and the Government of Canada". The agreement would allow for the establishment of a preclearance customs and immigration facility within Central Station in Montreal that could be used by both an extended Vermonter and Amtrak's existing Adirondack train.

Before the Vermonter can be extended to Montreal, the United States Congress must pass enabling legislation for the preclearance agreement and the Parliament of Canada must ratify the agreement. Construction of a preclearance facility in Central Station is expected to take about three years: one year for planning and permitting and two years for construction. Construction of the preclearance facility is not expected to start until after the preclearance agreement has been approved by both governments. Enabling legislation was enacted by the United States on December 16, 2016, as the Promoting Travel, Commerce, and National Security Act of 2016. As of late 2018, logistics have delayed the extended route's introduction until at least 2023. As of late 2021, according to Vermont transportation officials, while the United States remains active on the project, interest and engagement from regional and federal authorities on the Canadian side has frozen.

Saving around 1 hour 30 minutes between New Haven and Montreal, this scenario is forecast to incentivize an additional 31,100 to 40,900 riders per year by 2040. A key component to increasing the speed limit would be the installation of centralized traffic control from Greenfield to Brattleboro and from White River Junction to the border.

Operation

Equipment 
Most Vermonter trains consist of five cars hauled by a locomotive.

The passenger cars are the Amfleet I series passenger cars built by the Budd Company in the mid-to-late 1970s. Most trains include an Amfleet club car which has a combination of Business Class seating with a Café (food service/lounge) and five Coach Class cars.

Between New Haven and Washington, the service operates over the Northeast Corridor which has overhead electric wires and trains are pulled by Siemens ACS-64 electric locomotives at speeds up to 

In the coming years all equipment will be replaced with Amtrak Airo trainsets, the railroad's branding of its combination of Siemens Venture passenger cars and a Siemens Charger diesel-electric locomotive. The trainsets for the Vermonter will have six passenger cars, which will include a food service area and a mix of 2x2 Coach Class and 2x1 Business Class seating. The car closest to the locomotive will be a specialized "Auxiliary Power Vehicle" which will include a pantograph to collect power from overhead lines and will feed it to four traction motors in the car, and via a DC link cable, to the four traction motors in the locomotive. The arrangement will offer a near seamless transition between power sources at New Haven, a process that currently requires a time-consuming locomotive change.

Classes of service 
All classes of service include complimentary WiFi, an electric outlet (120 V, 60 Hz AC) at each seat, reading lamps, fold-out tray tables. Reservations are required on all trains, tickets may be purchased online, from an agent at some stations, a ticketing machine at most stations, or, at a higher cost, from the conductor on the train.
Coach Class: 2x2 seating. Passengers self-select seats on a first-come, first-served basis.
Business Class: 2x1 seating with more legroom than coach. Passengers receive complimentary soft drinks. Seats assigned in advance.

Route 

The Vermonter uses Amtrak and ConnDOT's electrified Northeast Corridor line from Washington, D.C., to New Haven, Connecticut. After switching to a diesel locomotive at New Haven, it then uses the Amtrak-owned New Haven–Springfield Line north to Springfield, Massachusetts, and the MassDOT-owned Connecticut River Line between Springfield and Northfield, Massachusetts. From Northfield to St. Albans, Vermont, it traverses New England Central Railroad trackage. Weekend trains have an additional stop at Metropark station in Iselin, New Jersey.

The Vermont Agency of Transportation offers discounted fares for travel between most Vermont stations along the route.

Station stops

See also
 Adirondack (train)
 Ethan Allen Express
 Maple Leaf (train)

References

Notes

Further reading

External links

 

Amtrak routes
Passenger rail transportation in Connecticut
Passenger rail transportation in Delaware
Passenger rail transportation in Maryland
Passenger rail transportation in Massachusetts
Passenger rail transportation in New Hampshire
Passenger rail transportation in New Jersey
Passenger rail transportation in New York (state)
Passenger rail transportation in Pennsylvania
Passenger rail transportation in Vermont
Passenger rail transportation in Washington, D.C.
Train-related introductions in 1995